The Cistercians are a Catholic religious order of enclosed monks and nuns formed in 1098, originating from Cîteaux Abbey. Their monasteries spread throughout Europe during the Middle Ages, but many were closed during the Protestant Reformation, the Dissolution of the Monasteries under King Henry VIII, the French Revolution, and the revolutions of the 18th century. Some survived and new monasteries have been founded since the 19th century.

There are a certain number of medieval monasteries and other Cistercian buildings (salt factories, watermills) that are abandoned or ruined, or converted into hotels such as Monasterio de Piedra or St. Bernard de Clairvaux Church.

Cistercian monasteries are divided into those that follow the Common Observance and the Strict Observance (Trappists). There are currently nearly 169 Trappist monasteries in the world, the home of approximately 2500 Trappist monks and 1800 Trappist nuns.

Europe

France

Great Britain and Ireland

Belgium

Central and Eastern Europe

Scandinavia

Germany

Austria

Czech Republic

Italy

Spain and Portugal

North America

Canada

United States

Australia and New Zealand

South America

Brasil

Asia

Hong Kong

Vietnam

See also
Cistercian architecture

Notes

External links
Cistercian Order of the Strict Observance (Trappists): Monasteries and Web Sites
BRASIL - Abadia de Nossa Senhora de São Bernardo (OCist.)

 
Cistercian